Neoguraleus ngatuturaensis is an extinct species of sea snail, a marine gastropod mollusk in the family Mangeliidae.

Description
The length of the shell attains 24 mm, its diameter 14.8 mm.

Distribution
This extinct marine species is endemic to New Zealand and Australia.

References

 Maxwell, P.A. (2009). Cenozoic Mollusca. pp 232–254 in Gordon, D.P. (ed.) New Zealand inventory of biodiversity. Volume one. Kingdom Animalia: Radiata, Lophotrochozoa, Deuterostomia. Canterbury University Press, Christchurch.

External links
  Bartrum & Powell, 1928, Austrofusus (Neocola) ngatuturaensis n. sp.; Transactions and Proceedings of the Royal Society of New Zealand Volume 59, 1928

ngatuturaensis
Gastropods described in 1928
Gastropods of New Zealand